The Motu are native inhabitants of Papua New Guinea, living along the southern coastal area of the country. Their indigenous language is also known as Motu, and like several other languages of the region is an Austronesian language. They and the Koitabu people are the original inhabitants and owners of the land on which Port Moresby — the national capital city — stands. The largest Motu village is Hanuabada, northwest of Port Moresby.

History 
Friedrich Ratzel in The History of Mankind reported in 1896 on tattooing in Melanesia. Among the relatively light-skinned Motu he found tattooing in patterns similar to those of Micronesia. He also reported, among the old women, blackening the body with a kind of earth which gives a lustre like black lead. This was said to be a sign of mourning.

Charles Gabriel Seligman came into contact with the Motu, in 1904. He noted that, unlike many of their neighbors in the region, the Motu did not practice exogamy. However, there was significant intermarriage between the coastal Motu and the more inland Koitabu. Every year, they practiced the hiri, when community members made trading voyages through the Gulf of Papua. Women made pottery for sale through the hiri.

Culture 
Despite increased westernization, the Motu still engage in some traditional practices. These include the value of traditional music and dance, observing the bridewealth and still retaining most of the land rights in the Port Moresby region.

See also
Motu (language)
Hiri Motu language
Hiri trade cycle

References

External links
The Races of Man in the Malay Archipelago
New Guinea and Its Inhabitants

Ethnic groups in Papua New Guinea
Indigenous peoples of Melanesia